Ride or Die may refer to:

 Ride or Die (album), a 2016 album by Devon Allman
 Ride or Die, a 2014 album by HeartsRevolution
 Ride or Die (song), a 2018 single by the Knocks featuring Foster the People
 "Ride or Die", a song by Megan Thee Stallion from the 2019 soundtrack Queen & Slim
 "Ride or Die", a song by Ashley Roberts from the 2014 album Butterfly Effect
 "Ride or Die", a song by Metro Station from the 2015 album Savior
 "Ride or Die", a song by Hippo Campus from the 2022 album LP3
 "Ride or Die", the original title of "Ride", a 2008 single by Ace Hood
 Ride or Die (2003 film), a crime drama film
 Ride or Die (2021 film), a 2021 Japanese film
 The Challenge: Ride or Dies the 38th installment of the reality competition series

See also
 "Ryde or Die, Bitch", a 1999 song by The Lox
Ride-or-die chick